Orfeo is a genus of South American dwarf spiders that was first described by J. A. Miller in 2007.

Species
 it contains two species:
Orfeo desolatus (Keyserling, 1886) – Brazil
Orfeo jobim Miller, 2007 (type) – Brazil

See also
 List of Linyphiidae species (I–P)

References

Araneomorphae genera
Linyphiidae
Spiders of Brazil